Grandiphyllum is a genus of flowering plants belonging to the family Orchidaceae.

Its native range is Southeastern and Southern Brazil to Northeastern Argentina.

Species:

Grandiphyllum auricula 
Grandiphyllum divaricatum 
Grandiphyllum edwallii 
Grandiphyllum hians 
Grandiphyllum ilhagrandense 
Grandiphyllum micranthum 
Grandiphyllum pohlianum 
Grandiphyllum schunkeanum

References

Oncidiinae
Oncidiinae genera